was a Japanese businessman, the founder of Wacoal, and the first President of Nippon Kaigi (1997–1998).

He was from the former town of Gokashō, now part of Higashiōmi, in Shiga Prefecture. He enlisted in the Imperial Japanese Army in 1940 and fought in Battle of Imphal during the Burma Campaign of the Pacific War, aged only 19. He was demobilized 3 years later at age 21.

In 1968, at an event held by the Japanese industrialist Kōnosuke Matsushita to celebrate the hundred years anniversary of the Meiji Restoration, he met the composer Toshiro Mayuzumi. He had a three decade friendship with him and attended his memorial on May 29, 1997.

Business activities

In 1946, he founded his own company in Kyoto, which made women's underwear such as bras, girdles, and nightgowns. His company became global after obtaining its current name (Wacoal) in 1957, with subsidiaries in United States, France, China, Singapore, Vietnam, and Thailand. He was a recipient of the Order of the Sacred Treasure. In 1998, the year of his death, his company had a net income of 8.2 billion Japanese yen ($61.2 million US) with sales of 170 billion yen ($1.2 billion US). His son, Yoshikata Tsukamoto, is the current chairman and president of Wacoal.

Bibliography
塚本幸一『私の履歴書』日本経済新聞社 1991年1月25日

References

External links
 ワコール

1920 births
1998 deaths
20th-century Japanese businesspeople
People from Shiga Prefecture
Recipients of the Order of the Sacred Treasure, 2nd class
Members of Nippon Kaigi
Japanese military personnel of World War II
Wacoal